0-D Beat Drop is a 2009 rhythm-puzzle video game developed by Cyclone Zero and JAMS SOFT and published by Aksys Games and Arc System Works.  With elements of Puyo Puyo and Lumines, the game has players organizing colored shapes onto a playing field in order to match three pieces and clear them using the game's titular Beat Drop, which requires the player to listen to the techno soundtrack. It also sponsored a Japanese K-pop band Sweat Vacation and the difficulty for this game was added based on it.

Gameplay
0-D Beat Drop is designed as combat puzzle game for two or more players. As the players match up differently shaped pieces in various colors, a group of blocks is stored in the bank. When a chain is completed, a certain number of pieces fall down on the opponent's playing field. The pieces drop from the top of the screen, and they need to be placed so that the colors match. Matches formed from three consecutive colors can be vertical, horizontal, or go around angles.

For a block to form a match, it has to be dropped within the beat of the techno track in the background. A meter on the side of the screen helps the players keep track of the current beat, and if the pieces are dropped while the meter is in the scoring zone, it will allow the blocks to be destroyed. Doing so for a successive chain of blocks increases the score multiplier, while also making the scoring zone on the meter smaller.

0-D Beat Drop consists of 6 game modes: Planet Quest, Co-Op, Survival Four, Time Attack, Task and Multiplayer. One of the features of the game is the Beat-O-Matic, which can analyze music from a USB drive or the 360 hard drive, determine its BPM, and sync the game with it.

Reception

O-D Beat Drop has received generally positive reviews from critics and holds a rating of 80 on Metacritic based on 11 reviews.

References

External links
0-D Beat Drop at Xbox.com

2009 video games
Falling block puzzle games
Puzzle video games
Puzzle-music video games
Xbox 360 games
Xbox 360-only games
Xbox 360 Live Arcade games
Video games developed in Japan
Arc System Works games
Multiplayer and single-player video games